Arthur Lee Daney (July 9, 1904 – March 11, 1988) was an American Major League Baseball pitcher. He played for the Philadelphia Athletics during the  season.

References

Major League Baseball pitchers
Philadelphia Athletics players
Baseball players from Oklahoma
1904 births
1988 deaths